The 2020–21 Brisbane Roar FC season is the club's 16th season. The club will participate in the A-League for the 16th time. The club will not compete in the 2020 FFA Cup due to the event being cancelled following the COVID-19 pandemic in Australia. The club was scheduled to play in the 2021 AFC Champions League qualifying play-offs in June 2021, but withdrew from the competition on 4 June 2021.

Players

Transfers

Transfers in

Transfers out

From youth squad

Contract extensions

Pre-season and friendlies

Competitions

Overview
{|class="wikitable" style="text-align:left"
|-
!rowspan=2 style="width:140px;"|Competition
!colspan=8|Record
|-
!style="width:30px;"|
!style="width:30px;"|
!style="width:30px;"|
!style="width:30px;"|
!style="width:30px;"|
!style="width:30px;"|
!style="width:30px;"|
!style="width:50px;"|
|-
|A-League

|-
|AFC Champions League

|-
!Total

A-League

League table

Results summary

Results by round

Matches

Finals series

AFC Champions League

Qualifying play-offs

Statistics

Appearances and goals
Players with no appearances not included in the list.

Goalscorers

Disciplinary record

Clean sheets

References

Brisbane Roar FC seasons
2020–21 A-League season by team